Little Egg Harbor is a brackish bay along the coast of southeast New Jersey. It was originally called Egg Harbor by the Dutch sailors because of the eggs found in nearby gull nests.

The bay is part of the Intracoastal Waterway.

The historical spelling for the bay is "Little Egg Harbour" as found on maps provide by Rutgers University: 1706, 1775, 1777, 1784, 1795, 1826, and 1834.

Tributaries
Tuckerton Creek
Westecunk Creek

References

External links
 ReClam the Bay RCTB is a grass roots volunteer non-profit environmental organization which grows and plants millions of clams and oysters in an effort to reclaim Barneget Bay and Little Egg Harbor.
 Nautical Chart of Little Egg Harbor
 Nutrient Concentrations in Surface Water and Groundwater, and Nitrate Source Identification Using Stable Isotope Analysis in the Barnegat Bay-Little Egg Harbor Watershed, New Jersey, 2010-11

Bays of New Jersey
Intracoastal Waterway
Bodies of water of Ocean County, New Jersey
Long Beach Island